Mahatma Gandhi Super Thermal Power Project  is located at Jharli village in Jhajjar district of Haryana. The coal based power project was developed by CLP India Private Limited, a subsidiary of CLP Group.

Capacity

See also 

 List of power stations in India

References 

Coal-fired power stations in Haryana
Jhajjar district
Energy infrastructure completed in 2012
2012 establishments in Haryana